Mount Yemlikli, also Emlikli, Emlik'li is a  tall mountain near Saghamo (village in Georgia) and between the Georgian provinces of Samtskhe-Javakheti and Kvemo Kartli. Yemlikli is one of the high peaks of the Lesser Caucasus Mountains and is in the Javakheti Range.

See also 
Javakheti Range
Javakheti Plateau
Mount Aghchala
Mount Leyli

References 

Mountains of Georgia (country)
Volcanoes of Georgia (country)
Geography of Kvemo Kartli
Geography of Samtskhe–Javakheti
Mountains of Samtskhe-Javakheti region